Merdeka Stadium is a multi-use stadium in Gorontalo, Indonesia.  It is currently used mostly for football matches and is used as the home venue for Rajawali Gorontalo of the Liga Indonesia. The stadium has a capacity of 10,000 spectators.

References

External links
Stadium information

Football venues in Indonesia
Buildings and structures in Gorontalo (province)